The Pomeranian Wall, Pomeranian Line or Pomeranian Position was a line of fortifications  constructed by Nazi Germany in the Pomeranian Lakeland region. It was constructed in two phases. In the years 1930-1935 it was constructed as a light defensive position in case of an attack from the Second Polish Republic against the German republic. The line of fortifications stretched from Landsberg an der Warthe (Gorzów Wielkopolski) to Baldenburg (Biały Bór) and Pollnow (Polanów). The fortifications had several impressive strong points, particularly near Deutsch-Krone (Wałcz) and the 'Hangman Mountain'. The second phase took place during the Second World War, in 1944, when after a series of defeats on the Eastern Front the Pomeranian Wall was renovated in order to stop the Red Army advance. Various battles along the Pomeranian Wall took place particularly from January to March 1945, for example, the Battle of Kolberg, with the Red Army and units of the Polish People's Army eventually breaking through the wall in various places.

The southern part of the position, near the Netze (Noteć) river, was known as the Noteć Line (Wall, Position) - Netzestellung, Wał Noteci.

References

External links
 Wał Pomorski - Pommernstellung
 POZYCJA NOTECI - Pommernstellung
 all info of fortress from Eastern Europe

German World War II defensive lines
Military installations of the Wehrmacht
World War II sites in Poland